Beamerella is a genus of chiggers belonging to the family Trombiculidae.

References

Trombiculidae
Trombidiformes genera